The 1959 Hawaii gubernatorial election was Hawaii's first gubernatorial election.  The election was held on July 28, 1959, one month after Hawaiians had voted for statehood in accordance with the Hawaii Admission Act and one month before admission as the 50th state on August 21, 1959.

In the election, the Republican candidate, Territorial Governor William F. Quinn, defeated the Democratic candidate, Territorial Delegate John A. Burns.  Quinn won only the island of Oahu while Burns carried all other islands.

General election

Results

References

1959
Gubernatorial
1959 United States gubernatorial elections
July 1959 events in the United States